Following the end of the nine-year terms of Series C senators, a senatorial election was held on 26 September 2001 in order to renew one-third of the members of the Senate.102 of the 322 seats were up for election.

Results

References 

Senate (France) elections
Senate election
Senate election